Marta Cano (born 27 September 1975) is a Spanish former professional tennis player.

Cano competed on the professional tour in the 1990s and reached a career high singles ranking of 356 in the world. 

Her only WTA Tour main draw appearance came in doubles, at the 1997 Madrid Open. She had a best doubles ranking of 213 and won seven doubles titles on the ITF Women's Circuit.

ITF finals

Singles: 3 (0–3)

Doubles: 13 (7–6)

References

External links
 
 

1975 births
Living people
Spanish female tennis players
20th-century Spanish women